Didymothallus criniceps is a fish species described by Werner W. Schwarzhans and Peter R. Møller in 2007. Didymothallus criniceps is part of the genus Didymothallus and the family Bythitidae. No subspecies are listed in the Catalog of Life.

References 

Bythitidae
Taxa named by Werner W. Schwarzhans
Taxa named by Peter R. Møller
Fish described in 2007